Uxbridge power station supplied electricity to the District of Uxbridge and the surrounding area from 1902 to 1962. The power station was built by the Uxbridge and District Electric Supply Company Limited which operated it until the nationalisation of the British electricity supply industry in 1948.

History 
The Uxbridge and District Electric Supply Company Limited was established in 1899 as a local enterprise to obtain Provisional Orders under the Electric Lighting Acts to generate and supply electricity to the District of Uxbridge. An Order was granted by the Board of Trade and was confirmed by Parliament through the Electric Lighting Orders Confirmation (No. 12) Act 1900 (63 & 64 Vict. c. clxx). Further Provisional Orders were obtained in 1903 and 1906.

The company was formed with capital of £1,000. By 1908 the capital amounted to £75,000, in 1911 the Company issued further stock of £75,000. The directors in 1911 were: Charles H McEuen (Director); Theodor Petersen (Assistant Manager); James O. Callender (Assistant Manager).

The power station in Waterloo Road Uxbridge (51°32’32”N 0°29’15”W) began to supply electricity in May 1902. The site was adjacent to the Grand Union Canal for delivery of coal by barge and for cooling water.

The Central Electricity Board built the first stages of the National Grid between 1927 and 1933. Uxbridge power station was connected to the 132 kV electricity grid.

In 1913 the electricity supply area included Greenford Urban District (UD); Hayes UD; Uxbridge UD; Uxbridge Rural District (RD); and Yiewsley UD. By 1936 the supply area included: Amersham RD; Beaconsfield UD; Ealing Metropolitan Borough (MB); Eton RD; Harrow UD; Hayes & Harlington UD; Ruislip-Northwood UD; Southall MB; and Yiewsley and West Drayton UD.

The British electricity supply industry was nationalised in 1948 under the provisions of the Electricity Act 1947 (10 & 11 Geo. 6 c. 54). The Uxbridge and District Electric Supply Company Limited was abolished, ownership of Uxbridge power station were vested in the British Electricity Authority, and subsequently the Central Electricity Authority and the Central Electricity Generating Board (CEGB). At the same time the electricity distribution and sales responsibilities of the Uxbridge and District Electric Supply Company Limited were transferred to the South Eastern Electricity Board (SEEBOARD).

Following nationalisation Uxbridge power station became part of the Uxbridge electricity supply district, covering an area of 69 square miles (179 km2).

Uxbridge power station was closed in 1963.

Equipment specification

Plant in 1913 & 1919 
The capacity and output of the generating plant at Uxbridge power station in 1913 and 1919 was as shown.

Plant in 1923 
By 1923 the plant at Uxbridge comprised boilers delivering a total of 105,000 lb/h (13.2 kg/s) of steam to:

 1 × 200 kW reciprocating engine generating alternating current (AC)
 2 × 300 kW reciprocating engine generating AC
 1 × 650 kW turbo-alternator generating AC
 2 × 1,000 kW turbo-alternator generating AC
 1 × 1,500 kW turbo-alternator generating AC

The total generating capacity was 4,950 kW.

Plant in 1936 
The plant data for 1936 was:

Plant in 1954 
By 1954 the plant comprised:

 Boilers:
 5 × Babcock and Wilcox marine boilers total evaporative capacity was 81,000 lb/h (10.2 kg/s), steam conditions were 200 psi and 600 °F (13.8 bar and 315 °C), steam was supplied to:
 Generators:
 2 × 1.1 MW Brush-Ljungstrom turbo-alternators, 3-phase, 50 Hz, 6,600 volts
 1 × 1.8 MW Brush-Ljungstrom turbo-alternators, 3-phase, 50 Hz, 6,600 volts

The total installed generating capacity was 4 MW.

Operations

Operating data 1913 and 1919 
Operating data for Uxbridge power station in 1913 and 1919 was:

Operating data 1921–23 
The electricity supply data for the period 1921–23 was:

Electricity Loads on the system were:

Revenue from the sale of current (in 1923) was £99,106; the surplus of revenue over expenses was £49,470

Operating data 1931–36 
Operating data for the station over the period 1931–36 was.

Operating data 1946 
In 1946 Uxbridge power station supplied 932.08 MWh of electricity; the maximum output load was 5,700 kW.

Operating data 1954–63 
Operating data for the period 1954–63 was:

The electricity output of Uxbridge power station, MWh

See also 

 Timeline of the UK electricity supply industry
 List of power stations in England

References 

Demolished power stations in the United Kingdom
Coal-fired power stations in England
Former power stations in England
Uxbridge